Fjords in Canada are long, narrow inlets characterized by steep sides, created in a valley carved by glacial activity. A fjord can have two or more basins separated by sills. Mountainous glaciated areas in Canada are along the British Columbia Coast: from the Alaskan border along the Portland Canal to Indian Arm. Kingcome Inlet is a typical west coast fjord.

In Newfoundland and Labrador, Saglek Fiord, Nachvak Fiord, and Hebron Fiord, are in Labrador. While Western Brook Pond, Trout River Big Pond, and Bonne Bay in Gros Morne National Park are located along the coastline of the island of Newfoundland.

Quebec's Saguenay River valley contains a fjord.

The Arctic Archipelago features fjords such as those around Ellesmere and Baffin Island, including Alexandra Fiord, Ellesmere Island, and Kangiqtualuk Uqquqti, Baffin Island.

When a portion of the high cliff wall falls off, it may cause a tsunami. This occurred in the early 20th century at Western Brook Pond of Gros Morne National Park when a  tsunami was created after Broke Off Cliff fell.

Fjords listed here may consist of several complex waterways. These waterways may contribute to the length of the fjord. For more information on these please see the main fjord source or Wikipedia article. Some examples are Dean Channel and Douglas Channel. The locality of Hagensborg in the Bella Coola Valley in the Dean Channel fjord was settled by Norwegian immigrants in 1894 as it reminded them of home. The total length of the fjord from the head of Dean Channel to the mouth of Fitz Hugh Sound is about  rivalling Hardangerfjord in Norway for length.

Anaktalak Bay, Saglek Fiord and Nachvak Fiord off the coast of Newfoundland and Labrador are being studied for environmental changes due to global warming. Increased tourism and marine traffic, contaminants from air, water or industrial pollution, changing weather patterns are affecting what once had been pristine water basins of the fjords protected by sills.

The use of the word canal to name fjords or inlets on the British Columbian and Southeast Alaskan coast is a legacy of the Spanish expeditions to the Pacific Northwest in the 18th century. For example, Haro Strait between Victoria and the San Juan Islands was originally Canal de Haro. The English cognate to the Spanish canal is "channel", which is found throughout the coast, cf. Dean Channel.

Some fjords on the British Columbian coast have rapids, termed skookumchucks which means strong waters in Chinook Jargon). Skookumchucks are caused by the shallows and narrows near the mouth of a fjord as the water inside the fjord's depths is drawn through, to or from, the more open waters beyond.

The phenomenon of mountain-gap wind or squamish or outflow affects the fjords of Canada and Norway. The outflow winds at the Salt and Bols fjords of Norway and the Howe Sound and Portland Inlet of Canada have been compared. European winds may be termed bora. The cold dry air of the continental interior seeks out the easier passage through the fjord valley creating hurricane-force winds.

According to the definition, fjord, Western Brook Pond and Trout River Big Pond in Newfoundland's Gros Morne National Park, are also often described as a fjords, but are actually freshwater lakes cut off from the sea, so is not a fjord in the English sense of the term. Such lakes are sometimes called "fjord lakes".

List of fjords

See also
 List of fjords of the United States

References

External links

Lists of landforms of Canada
Canada